Kumalarang, officially the Municipality of Kumalarang (Subanen: Benwa Kumalarang; Chavacano: Municipalidad de Kumalarang), is a 4th class municipality in the province of Zamboanga del Sur, Philippines. According to the 2020 census, it has a population of 29,479 people.

History

Kumalarang was organized into a municipality through Executive Order No. 356, issued by President Carlos P. Garcia on August 28, 1959. It consists of seven "barrios and sitios" of Lapuyan, including Barrio Kumalarang which was designated as the seat of government, and six of Malangas (now part of Zamboanga Sibugay), all then part of the then-undivided Zamboanga del Sur.

Geography

Barangays
Kumalarang is politically subdivided into 18 barangays.

Climate

Demographics

Economy

References

External links
 Kumalarang Profile at PhilAtlas.com
 [ Philippine Standard Geographic Code]
Philippine Census Information

Municipalities of Zamboanga del Sur